Yosemite National Park is well known for its granite domes:

References

 
Landforms of Yosemite National Park